Had We But World Enough is a 1950 Australian play by Oriel Gray.

The play made its debut in 1950 at the New Theatre.

Plot
A school teacher casts an aboriginal girl as the Virgin Mary in a play.

Reception
The Age called it "well worth seeing."

The Adelaide News liked the first half.

Legacy
The play is now commonly regarded as being ahead of its time in its treatment of race relations in Australia. It was published in 2018.

References

External links
Had We But World Enough at Fryer Library
Had We But World Enough at AustLit

1950 in theatre
1950 plays